Töreboda Municipality (Töreboda kommun) is a municipality in Västra Götaland County in western Sweden. Its seat is located in the town of Töreboda and it includes the population centers of Älgarås and Moholm.

The present municipality was formed in 1971, when the market town (köping) of Töreboda (itself instituted in 1909) was amalgamated with Moholm and parts of Undenäs and Hova.

References

External links

Töreboda Municipality - Official site

Municipalities of Västra Götaland County
Skaraborg